2015–16 Jordan League Division 1 featured 10 teams from the 2014–15 campaign, two new teams relegated from the 2014–15 Premier League: Mansheyat Bani Hasan and Ittihad Al-Ramtha, and two new teams promoted from the 2014–15 Jordan League Division 2: Al-Aqaba and Al-Turra.

Sahab won the league title and promoted to 2016–17 Jordan Premier League along with Mansheyat Bani Hasan. Al-Sheikh Hussein and Ittihad Al-Zarqa were relegated to the 2016–17 Jordan League Division 2.

Teams
Teams relegated from the 2014–15 Premier League
Mansheyat Bani Hasan
Ittihad Al-Ramtha

Teams promoted from the 2014–15 Jordan League Division 2
Al-Aqaba
Al-Turra

Stadiums and locations

League table

References

 

Jordan
2